Libby Liggins is an evolutionary ecologist and a Senior Lecturer in the School of Natural and Computational Science at Massey University, Auckland, New Zealand, as well as a research associate at Auckland Museum. Her research uses genetic and genomic data to explore the biogeography, population ecology, and biodiversity of marine organisms.

Life and career

Liggins grew up in Northland, New Zealand. She graduated from Victoria University of Wellington in 2005 with a Bachelor of Science, followed by a MSc exploring the population genetics of mainland New Zealand skinks and the Chatham Islands skink (Oligosoma nigriplantare). Liggins was a Blake Antarctic Ambassador in 2008, carrying out environmental monitoring on a wind farm project to supply electricity to Scott Base and McMurdo Station.

She then completed a PhD at the University of Queensland in 2013 in Cynthia Riginos's lab, with Hugh Possingham, and Eric Treml as additional supervisors, using mitochondrial and microsatellite markers to study the colonisation and dispersal of marine fishes and echinoderms around coral reefs of Australia and the West Pacific. She was part of the 2013 Auckland Museum expedition to the Three Kings Islands. Liggins was a Graduate Fellow at the National Evolutionary Synthesis Center in Durham, North Carolina from March to August 2014, working with the "Advancing genetic diversity research in the Indian and Pacific Oceans" group. Liggins then moved to the Albany campus of Massey University to take up an Allan Wilson Centre postdoctoral fellowship for a year, afterwards becoming a lecturer in marine ecology. She won a Rutherford Foundation New Zealand postdoctoral fellowship in 2015 and became a Senior Lecturer in 2018. In 2020, Liggins received a five year Rutherford Discovery Fellowship to work on a project titled Tohu of change for Aotearoa New Zealand’s marine biodiversity, based at Massey University.

Liggins has spoken out against proposed cuts to science research at Massey University's Albany campus, in which 50 staff jobs were under threat, and some majors such as marine biology were to be discontinued.

Research 
Liggins was project coordinator for the Ira Moana – Genes of the Sea – Network, a collaborative researcher network and database project to advance marine genetic research in New Zealand. The 2018–2020 project aimed to create a comprehensive genetic database that collected and curated all the metadata from thousands of biological samples, involving over 85 researchers and 25 institutions. The database also allows metadata to be tagged with "Traditional Knowledge" notices, to signal that indigenous people have rights associated with the genetic data. In 2019 Liggins won the World Data System (WDS) Data Stewardship Award for her work on the project.

In 2020 Liggins and her colleagues discovered three new records of fish species not previously known from the Kermadec Islands Marine Reserve. The observations were captured in hundreds of hours of unused underwater footage recorded in 2015, from a wildlife documentary being filmed while Liggins and her colleagues were on an expedition to the Kermadecs to collect DNA samples.

Selected works

References

External links
 

Living people
Academic staff of the Massey University
New Zealand marine biologists
New Zealand women academics
People from the Northland Region
University of Queensland alumni
Victoria University of Wellington alumni
Year of birth missing (living people)